Cristian Ríos (born 18 July 1980) was an Argentine footballer.

He played for clubs like Racing Club, Boca Juniors, Cobreloa and Municipal Iquique.

Honours

Club
Racing
 Argentine Primera División (1): 2001 Clausura

Deportes Iquique
 Primera B (1): 2010
 Copa Chile (1): 2010

External links
Profile at BDFA

1980 births
Living people
Argentine footballers
Argentine expatriate footballers
Argentina international footballers
Argentine Primera División players
Categoría Primera A players
Chilean Primera División players
Primera B de Chile players
Unión de Santa Fe footballers
San Martín de San Juan footballers
Racing Club de Avellaneda footballers
Boca Juniors footballers
Club Almagro players
Talleres de Córdoba footballers
Cobreloa footballers
Cobresal footballers
Deportes Iquique footballers
Independiente Medellín footballers
Expatriate footballers in Chile
Expatriate footballers in Colombia
Argentine expatriate sportspeople in Chile
Argentine expatriate sportspeople in Colombia
Association football midfielders
Footballers from Buenos Aires